Daeyami Station is a railway station on Seoul Subway Line 4, located in Gunpo city. It is between Surisan Station and Banwol Station. The station only serves Northbound and Southbound services on one line. The name of the subway station comes from its local name. Regional names refer to the size of small fields.

Surroundings 
Lake Banwol is located at the very bottom of the Daiya-dong neighborhood. It was completed in 1957, and the water in the northwestern wing of the house, the semimol, and the rocks of the provincial bank flows to the southeast direction and flows to Lake Banwol.

Station layout

References

Metro stations in Gunpo
Seoul Metropolitan Subway stations
Railway stations opened in 1988